Quizás mañana is a 2013 Peruvian romantic drama film written and directed by Jesús Alvarez Betancourt (in his directorial debut) and starring Bruno Ascenzo and Gisela Ponce de León.

Synopsis 
Juan Carlos and Natalia are two young people who are going through a particularly difficult day. They both meet on the streets of Magdalena del Mar and without knowing each other, they decide to keep each other company. For some reason they make a connection and spend a day together talking, laughing, getting angry, having a true catharsis that will mark their lives forever.

Cast 
The actors participating in this film are:

 Bruno Ascenzo as Juan Carlos
 Gisela Ponce de León as Natalia
 Roger del Águila as Waiter
 Carolina Cano as Juan Carlos' Sister
 Javier Echevarría as Juan Carlos' Father
 Liliana Trujillo as Saleswoman

Production 
Filming began on May 6, 2012, in Lima (Magdalena del Mar) and concluded the same month. It is the second production of Big Bang Films and has Sandro Ventura as producer.

Reception

Box-office 
The film managed to convene five thousand people on the day of its premiere in Lima and twenty thousand in its first week. It had more than five thousand spectators in its debut in the provinces.

Awards

References

External links 
 

2013 films
2013 romantic drama films
Peruvian romantic drama films
Big Bang Films films
2010s Peruvian films
2010s Spanish-language films
Films set in Peru
Films shot in Peru
2013 directorial debut films
Films about death
Films about painters